Chamas da Vida is a Brazilian telenovela produced by RecordTV. It premiered on July 8, 2008 and aired until April 28, 2009, at 9:45 p.m. schedule. Created by Cristianne Fridman, the telenovela is written by her in collaboration with Paula Richard, Renata Dias Gomes, Camilo Pellegrini and Nélio Abbade. It is directed by Edgard Miranda, Roberto Bomtempo and Rudi Lagemann.

Plot 
Pedro is a firefighter which lives in the neighborhood of Tinguá, in the border of Rio de Janeiro and Nova Iguaçu municipalities. After the sudden death of his parents, Pedro became responsible for the custody of his three brothers: Viviane, Rafael and trouble-maker Antônio, who works on GG ("Gelado-e-Gostoso", which is Portuguese for "Icy-and-Delicious"), a fictional ice cream factory located in Tinguá. At nights, Antônio and his gang ("Gangue do Ferro-Velho", Portuguese for "The Junkyard Gang") practices acts of vandalism on the neighborhood, what makes his relationship with Pedro progressively estranged. Pedro dates Ivonete, twin sister of Lieutenant Wallace, Pedro's best friend since childhood.

Carolina is the only child of Walter and Arlete, founders of GG. She lives in the upper-class neighborhood of Urca and manages her own video production company. She dates Tomás for three years. She is about to marry him, without suspecting that all he wants is to take control of GG. Tomás is the son of manipulative Vilma, co-founder of GG, which wants them to get marry for her to control GG once again. Her late husband João co-founded GG with Walter, Arlete and her, but Walter dissolved the partnership after João was accused of corruption, taking control of all the factory shares himself.

Pedro and Carolina where friends at childhood, but lost personal contact after they became adults. After Antônio set fire on a  fraternization of GG workers, they meet once again. They feel a sudden attraction for each other, what causes instantaneous jealousy on Tomás. A security worker deletes Antônio, who loses his job, compromising even more the troubled relationship with his brother. Carolina was filming the fraternization and returns at the factory at the same night to pick up her camera. She sees herself trapped when somebody sets the building on fire. Pedro and Wallace go for her rescue and, on the meanwhile, Wallace dies. Antônio's gang was depredating GG's wall during the same night, and he is suspected of setting the place on fire. The factory works are transferred to a second building on the same area.

Realizing the mutual interest between Carolina and Pedro, Ivonete decides to ally with Tomás to separate them. The plan fails, and Carolina starts dating Pedro, while Tomás starts a relationship with Ivonete. Vilma, the real incendiary, falsifies an insurance policy to look like Walter set his own factory on fire. She set the factory on fire to eliminate proof that she and Tomás were committing corruption. Tomás' hate against Walter and his family is fed by his mother, who tells him that Walter was responsible for João's death. According to her, João could not handle the pressure of being accused by Walter and died of a heart attack. It is then revealed that João died after being hit on the head by Miguel, Vilma's lover. After discovering this, Tomás turns against his mother, which becomes the main suspect of setting the factory on fire after the testimonies of Verônica and Ricardo, secretaries on the factory, which had seen her with her second victim, an insurance worker which she bribed to falsify the policy whose car had blown up. After Walter dies on a set-up, it is revealed that there is a second incendiary, self-named "Phoenix", who is trying to incriminate Vilma. The identity of Walter's killer (i.e. "Phoenix") remained unknown until the last chapter, when the mysterious firer armed an ambush which resulted in Arlete's death (she was exploded alive inside her own car while chasing after Vilma) and Vilma incriminated with murder, thus sending her to prison. Through a teddy bear encasing a cell phone linked with a powerful bomb, "Phoenix" revealed himself to Vilma to be indeed Leo, partnered with his older sister Darlene, the villainess's former house maid. Leo and Darlene finally reveal their prime motive to destroy Vilma: they were both children of the deceased legist doctor whom Vilma bribed to deliver a false autopsy record surrounding João's death; times later, the same doctor, unable to live anymore with the shame of doing such an unethical thing, committed suicide, thus triggering Leo's and Darlene's thirst of revenge against Vilma for their father. Vilma is then killed by the blast, but "Phoenix"'s identities remained unknown for anyone else in the series.

Cast 

 Leonardo Brício - Corporal Pedro Galvão Ferreira
 Juliana Silveira - Carolina Monteiro Azevedo de Castro
 Lucinha Lins - Vilma Oliveira Santos
 Bruno Ferrari - Tomás Oliveira Santos
 Amandha Lee - Ivonete
 Dado Dolabella - Antônio Galvão Ferreira
 Jussara Freire - Arlete Monteiro Azevedo de Castro
 Antônio Grassi - Dr. Walter Azevedo de Castro
 Floriano Peixoto - Miguel Costa
 Íris Bruzzi - Tereza ("Vó Tuquinha")
 Andréia Horta - Beatriz Oliveira Santos
 Letícia Colin - Viviane Galvão Ferreira ("Vivi")
 Ana Paula Tabalipa - Raíssa Mendes
 Milhem Cortaz - Corporal Carlos José Lima ("Cazé")
 Roger Gobeth - Corporal Guilherme Pimenta Britto ("Gui")
 Ewerton de Castro - Hermes Britto Pimenta ("Seu Britto")
 André Fillippi di Mauro - Felipe Rezende ("Lipe")
 Raymundo de Souza - Colonel-Lieutenant Eurico Camargo
 Umberto Magnani - Dionísio Cardoso de Oliveira
 Giuseppe Oristanio - Roberto Cardoso de Oliveira
 Juliana Lohmann - Manuella Castelli ("Manu")
 Luíza Curvo - Michelle Gomes
 Andressa Oliveira - Lídia
 Nathália Rodrigues - Suelen Almeida Batista
 Gabriel Gracindo - Corporal Eurico Camargo Jr. ("Júnior")
 Nina de Pádua - Lourdes
 Stela Freitas - Dra. Roseclair Pimenta Britto
 Catarina Abdalla - Margareth das Dores Vieira
 Ivone Hoffmann - Odiléia Pimenta
 Marilu Bueno - Tia Catarina
 Mariana Hein - Andressa
 Dáblio Moreira - Máicon das Dores Vieira ("Demorô")
 Thiago de Los Reyes - Gustavo Oliveira Santos ("Guga")
 Vítor Hugo - Fernando Teixeira ("Marreta")
 Claudiana Cotrim - Darlene
 Rafael Queiroga - Leonardo ("Léo") / "Phoenix"
 Edward Boggis - Diego
 Roberta Santiago - Gildete Rodrigues
 Lisandra Parede - Telma
 Giordanna Forte - Cintia Teixeira
 Guilherme Leme - André
 Roberto Bontempo - Marcos ("Docinho")
 Rodrigo Faro - Corporal Wallace
 Sandra Pêra - Mercedes Ferreira
 Igor Cotrim - Jairo
 André Luiz Miranda - "Lincoln"

Controversies 

One of the characters of the supporting cast, Viviane, gets involved with Lipe, a pedophile, on the internet. After his mother's death, Lipe moves from São Paulo to Nova Iguaçu, and ends up raping Viviane in the forest. After his second rape attempt, Lipe is caught by the police, but escapes. Viviane gets pregnant and undergoes an abortion. Besides being a legal procedure on rape cases in Brazil, abortion was never treated in a frank and positive way on telenovelas such as it has been on Chamas da Vida. On the other hand, the telenovela also portrays the drama of women who decide to carry on a pregnancy resulted from rape with the character of Raíssa. She is forced by her parents to give birth to Gabriel, who is raised as her brother. After both her parents die in a car accident, she becomes responsible for Gabriel, taking him from the countryside to Nova Iguaçu. The telenovela was also groundbreaking in Brazil for showing the prejudice transsexual people suffer with the character of Carlão/Docinho (lived by Roberto Bomtempo, one of its directors).

Audience 
Chamas da Vida premiered at second place on the audience ratings. After SBT started to rerun Pantanal, the telenovela lost part of its audience. However, it remained on the second place, losing it to Pantanal once in a while. After the end of both Pantanal and Rede Globo's A Favorita, Chamas da Vida rose its audience ratings. The telenovela has reached an average rating of 15,5 in Rio de Janeiro and of 13,8 in São Paulo. Although its audience rating is higher in Rio than in São Paulo, proportionally Chamas da Vida has almost the double of viewers in the latter.

External links 
 
 

2008 telenovelas
2008 Brazilian television series debuts
2009 Brazilian television series endings
Brazilian telenovelas
RecordTV telenovelas
Portuguese-language telenovelas
Television shows set in Rio de Janeiro (city)
Television series about firefighting